Markandey Chand is an Indian politician. He was elected to the Uttar Pradesh Legislative Assembly from Dhuriapar in the 1980, 1989, 1991 and 1996 elections as a member of the Bharatiya Janata Party. He is a minister in the Mayawati government as well as Minister of Minor Irrigation and Rural Engineering in Rajnath Singh ministry.

References

1933 births
2017 deaths
Members of the Uttar Pradesh Legislative Assembly
Members of the Uttar Pradesh Legislative Council
Janata Dal politicians
Bahujan Samaj Party politicians from Uttar Pradesh
Indian National Congress politicians from Uttar Pradesh
Lok Janshakti Party politicians
Bharatiya Janata Party politicians from Uttar Pradesh
People from Gorakhpur